Dentifusus is a genus of sea snails, marine gastropod mollusks in the family Fasciolariidae, the spindle snails, the tulip snails and their allies.

Species
Species within the genus Dentifusus include:

 Dentifusus deynzeri Vermeij & Rosenberq, 2003

References

  Geerat J. Vermeij and Gary Rosenberg, Dentifusus, a new genus of fasciolariid gastropod from the Philippines with a labral tooth, Proceedings of the Academy of Natural Sciences of Philadelphia, vol. 153 (1), pp. 23-26, 2003

Fasciolariidae
Monotypic gastropod genera